Hosteen Klah (1867– February 27, 1937) was a Navajo artist and medicine man. He documented aspects of Navajo religion and related ceremonial practices. As a traditional nádleehi person, he was both a ceremonial singer and master weaver.

Background
Hosteen (spelled "Hastiin" in the Navajo language) Klah was born to Navajo parents Hoksay Nolyae and Ahson Tsosie in 1867 in the Tunicha Valley of New Mexico, USA. He was called "Klah" for being left-handed. Able to avoid residential schooling, Klah learned traditional Navajo spirituality from his uncle, who was a medicine man. Klah was trained in healing ceremonies that involved dancing, chanting, singing, and sandpainting- the act of creating temporary designs on the ground using colored dirt and shells. Klah was able to fully memorize and perform his first ceremony by only age ten.

Gender
Hosteen Klah was commonly identified as a Nádleeh (pl. Nádleehi, meaning "one-who-has-been-changed"). Nádleehi are a third gender recognized by the Navajo people who take on both traditionally male and female roles, in Klah's case, being a healer (a traditionally male role) and a weaver (a traditionally female role). Nádleehi at the time, including Klah, were often assigned male at birth, though some may have been intersex. They would also often dress in traditionally women's clothing, although Klah did not. Klah was also reportedly not interested in women and never married.

Weaving
Klah mastered multiple traditional art forms, most notably sandpainting and weaving (which he learned from his mother). Klah wove his first complete weaving at the 1892–1893 World's Columbian Exposition in Chicago, where he also was probably part of a sandpainting demonstration. Around 1914 Klah began experimenting with combining other sacred imagery of with the act of weaving, and wove imagery from the Yéʼii bicheii dance into a rug. He completed his first sandpainting-inspired weaving around 1919. Some fellow healers within his community found these weavings controversial, as sandpaintings and their imagery produced during ceremonies are purposefully meant to be non-permanent- Klah did not conform to this by weaving them into a more permanent form. His colorful and intricate designs caught the eye of various art collectors, many of which purchased his work.

Klah went on to demonstrate sandpainting in 1934, at the Century of Progress Exhibition in Chicago, of which President Franklin D. Roosevelt was in attendance.

Klah taught his two nieces both his weaving techniques and designs before his death in 1937.

Wheelwright Museum
In 1921, Hosteen Klah was introduced to Mary Cabot Wheelwright, a Boston heiress. The two became friends and collaborated in founding the Wheelwright Museum of the American Indian in Santa Fe, New Mexico. Fearing for the future of Navajo religion after witnessing decades of assimilationist assaults on traditional culture by missionaries and the US government, Klah wanted to document Navajo religion and make it available for future generations. The museum was initially called the Navajo House of Prayer and House of Navajo Religion, but then renamed the Museum of Navajo Ceremonial Art, and ultimately renamed in 1977, when the museum repatriated sensitive cultural patrimony back to the Navajo Nation.

In 1942 the Museum of Navajo Ceremonial Art (as it was then called) published Navajo Creation Myth - the Story of the Emergence by Hosteen Klah, Recorded by Mary C. Wheelwright.

Death
Hosteen Klah died on February 27, 1937, from pneumonia, and he is buried on the grounds of the Wheelwright Museum.

See also
 Navajo rug
 Navajo way
 Wheelwright Museum of the American Indian

Notes

References 
 Berlo, Janet C., and Phillips, Ruth B. (1998) Native North American Art. Oxford: Oxford University Press, . 1998, and later reprints.
 Everett, Deborah, and Elayne Zorn. “Hastiin Klah (1867–1937), Navajo Weaver.” Encyclopedia of Native American Artists, Greenwood Press, 2008.
  1971, and later reprints.
 
 Koenig, Seymour H., and Harriet Koenig. Acculturation in the Navajo Eden: New Mexico, 1550-1750. YBK Publishers, 2005.
 Roscoe, Will. “We’Wha and Klah: The American Indian Berdache as Artist and Priest.” American Indian Quarterly, vol. 12, no. 2, 1988, p. 127., https://doi.org/10.2307/1184319.
 Stein, Marc. “Klah, Hostiin.” Encyclopedia of Lesbian, Gay, Bisexual, and Transgender History in America, Charles Scribner's Sons/Thomson/Gale, 2004.

Navajo artists
American weavers
Native American textile artists
Religious figures of the indigenous peoples of North America
Two-spirit people
American animists
1867 births
1937 deaths
Museum founders
Folk healers